Weisbecker, Weißbecker or Weissbecker is a German surname. Notable people with the surname include:

Allan Weisbecker, American novelist
Dmitry Weisbecker-Ivanov (born 1970), Russian poet
Laura Weissbecker (born 1984), French actress 

German-language surnames